Lodi Point State Park (also known as Lodi Point Marine Park) is a  state park in New York State, United States.  The park is in the Town of Lodi in Seneca County.  Lodi Point state park is on the east shore of Seneca Lake, one of the Finger Lakes.

The park is primarily a boating access point to Seneca Lake, lying west of the Village of Lodi. The park offers picnic tables, a playground with pavilions, a boat launch, and a marina.

See also 
 List of New York state parks

References

External links
  New York State Parks: Lodi Point State Park

State parks of New York (state)
Parks in Seneca County, New York
Finger Lakes